The Cage is a 1963 French film directed by Robert Darène. It was entered into the 1963 Cannes Film Festival.

Cast
 Marina Vlady
 Jean Servais - Rispal
 Philippe Mory
 Muriel David
 Colette Duval
 Alain Bouvette

References

External links

1963 films
1960s French-language films
French black-and-white films
Films directed by Robert Darène
1960s French films